Elijah Taylor may refer to:
 Elijah Taylor (rugby league) (born 1990), New Zealand rugby league player
 Elijah Taylor (Australian footballer) (born 2001), Australian rules footballer